Lim Yoke Wah (born 6 January 1986 in Ipoh, Perak) is a professional squash player who represented Malaysia.

Lim grew up at her birthplace Ipoh and started playing squash aged ten after being introduced to the sport by a coach. She was trained by Lee See Wee and Ahmed Malik from Pakistan. 

In 2002, Lim represented Malaysia at the Hong Kong Junior Open and defeated Lau Siu-ying (劉小瑩) of Hong Kong to win the tournament. In 2006, Lim became the first Malaysian to win a gold medal at the World University Squash Championships. By that year, Lim ranked as the top women's player in Perak.
 
During her squash career she was based in Kuala Lumpur and coached by Ahmed Malik while studying at Universiti Putra Malaysia.

External links 

https://www.thestar.com.my/news/community/2006/10/27/yoke-wah-stunner/

1986 births
Living people
Malaysian female squash players
Malaysian people of Chinese descent
People from Ipoh
21st-century Malaysian women